The term Woodstock Nation refers specifically to the attendees of the original 1969 Woodstock Music and Arts Festival that took place from August 15–17 on the farm of Max Yasgur near Bethel, New York.  It comes from the title of a book written later that year by Yippie activist Abbie Hoffman, describing his experiences at the festival.

More generally, however, the term is used as a catch-all phrase for those individuals of the baby boomer generation in the United States who subscribed to the values of the American counterculture of the 1960s and early 1970s. The term is often interchangeable with hippie, although the latter term is sometimes used as an oath of derision.
The characteristic traits of members of the Woodstock Nation include, but are not limited to, concern for the environment, embracing of left-wing political causes and issues allied to a strong sense of political activism, eschewing of traditional gender roles, vegetarianism, and enthusiasm for the music of the period. 

The Woodstock Nation also counts as members individuals from later generational cohorts, as the underground cultural values and attitudes of 1960s bohemian communities such as Haight-Ashbury and Laurel Canyon have seeped ever more into the mainstream with the passage of time.

External links
Woodstock Nation Foundation

Hippie movement
Woodstock Festival